The 1909 Alabama Crimson Tide football team (variously "Alabama", "UA" or "Bama") represented the University of Alabama in the 1909 college football season. It was the Crimson Tide's 17th overall and 14th season as a member of the Southern Intercollegiate Athletic Association (SIAA). The team was led by head coach J. W. H. Pollard, in his fourth year, and played their home games at the University of Alabama Quad in Tuscaloosa and the Birmingham Fairgrounds in Birmingham, Alabama. They finished the season with a record of five wins, one loss and two ties (5–1–2 overall, 4–1–1 in the SIAA).

Defensively, Alabama had six consecutive shutouts to go 5–0–1 before they surrendered their first touchdown against Tulane in their 5–5 tie.

Schedule

Game summaries

Union (TN) 

Alabama opened the season with this 16–0 victory over Union University at Tuscaloosa. Although scoreless at the end of the first half, Alabama was in position several times to score. The Crimson Tide lost a fumble at the Union five yard line and Derrill Pratt missed field goals of 40, 45 and 53 yards. Alabama scored its first touchdown on a short Jere Austill run early in the second half after the Crimson tide blocked a Union punt at their five-yard line. Pratt and David Palmer scored Alabama's other two touchdowns later in the half en rote to the 16–0 win. The victory brought Alabama's all-time record against Union to 1–0.

Howard 

Against the Bulldogs, Alabama secured their second consecutive shutout to open the season with this 14–0 victory over Howard College (now known as Samford University).

The victory brought Alabama's all-time record against Howard to 3–0.

Clemson 
Clemson was beaten by a 52-yard Del Pratt field goal.

Ole Miss 
Ole Miss and Alabama fought to a scoreless tie.

Georgia 
Georgia was beaten 14–0.

Tennessee 
Tennessee was beaten 10–0.

Tulane 
Tulane and Alabama tied 5–5.

LSU 
Alabama completed their season with a 12–5 loss to LSU at Birmingham to finish 5–1–2.

Roster

Notes

References 
General

 

Specific

Alabama
Alabama Crimson Tide football seasons
Alabama Crimson White football